"The Most Beautiful Girl" is a song recorded by Charlie Rich and written by Billy Sherrill, Norro Wilson, and Rory Bourke. The countrypolitan ballad reached No. 1 in the United States in 1973 on three Billboard music charts: the pop chart (two weeks), the country chart (three weeks), and the adult contemporary chart (three weeks), as well as in Canada on three RPM charts: the RPM 100 Top Singles chart, the Country Tracks chart, and the Adult Contemporary chart. Billboard ranked it as the No. 23 song for 1974.

The song is actually a merging of two songs previously recorded by Wilson: "Hey Mister" (from 1968). which forms a major part of the song; and "Mama McCluskie”, used in part in the chorus.

The B-side, Rich's own "I Feel Like Going Home”, was later covered by Rita Coolidge and was released on her 1974 album Fall into Spring.
British pop singer Engelbert Humperdinck covered "The Most Beautiful Girl" on his 1973 album Engelbert: King of Hearts.

"The Most Beautiful Girl" was also recorded by Slim Whitman in the 1970s. Andy Williams released a version in 1974 on his album The Way We Were. In 1975 ABBA singer Anni-Frid Lyngstad recorded a Swedish-language version called "Vill du låna en man?" (with Swedish lyrics by Stig Anderson) on her solo album Frida ensam. Sergio Franchi recorded the song on his 1976 DynaHouse album 20 Magnificent Songs. Country music boy band South 65 recorded an updated version of the song, titled "The Most Beautiful Girl (2001 Version)”. on their 2001 album Dream Large.

The song receives a very brief airing by Brenda Fricker in the film So I Married an Axe Murderer. Jason Alexander offered a rendition as his character George Costanza on the December 16, 1992, episode of the sitcom Seinfeld titled "The Pick", where he bemoaned the loss of his girlfriend, Susan. The song is featured prominently in the 2018 horror film The Ranger.

Chart performance

Weekly charts

Year-end charts

All-time charts

Adverts
In 1989 the song featured in a advert for Telecom Eireann.

References

1973 singles
Songs written by Norro Wilson
Songs written by Rory Bourke
Songs written by Billy Sherrill
Charlie Rich songs
South 65 songs
Andy Williams songs
Song recordings produced by Billy Sherrill
Billboard Hot 100 number-one singles
Cashbox number-one singles
RPM Top Singles number-one singles
Epic Records singles
Atlantic Records singles
1973 songs